Prychia is a genus of huntsman spiders that was first described by Ludwig Carl Christian Koch in 1875.

Species
 it contains five species, found on Fiji, in Papua New Guinea, the Philippines, and on the Polynesian Islands:
Prychia gracilis L. Koch, 1875 (type) – New Guinea to Fiji, Polynesia
Prychia maculata Karsch, 1878 – New Guinea
Prychia paalonga (Barrion & Litsinger, 1995) – Philippines (Mindanao)
Prychia pallidula Strand, 1911 – New Guinea
Prychia suavis Simon, 1897 – Philippines

See also
 List of Sparassidae species

References

Araneomorphae genera
Sparassidae
Spiders of Asia
Spiders of Oceania
Taxa named by Ludwig Carl Christian Koch